Eric Mahn Godoy (1 June 1925 – March 2001) was a Chilean basketball player. He competed in the men's tournament at the 1952 Summer Olympics.

References

External links

1925 births
2001 deaths
Chilean men's basketball players
Olympic basketball players of Chile
Basketball players at the 1952 Summer Olympics
People from Talcahuano
Place of death missing